Mykola Fedorovych Grabar (born 1962) was a self-nominated candidate in the 2004 Ukrainian presidential election. Previously a national deputy of Ukraine. Since 1998 he has been a lawyer of the Kyiv Bar. He was a member of the Kyiv City Council three times. If elected, he promised to double the income of Ukrainian citizens by 2006 and to return $20 billion that were taken out from Ukraine to the United States illegally.

References

Living people
Candidates in the 2004 Ukrainian presidential election
People from Khust
1962 births